The Honda CB125 is a  motorcycle made by Honda from 1971–1985 (1973–1985 in the US). It had a single-cylinder overhead camshaft (OHC) engine with a 9500 rpm redline. The "S" model was produced from 1971 to 1975 and was replaced in 1976 by the "J" model (the US bikes retained the S designation). The newer model sported a two piece head,  displacement, and a larger carburettor.

Major changes
Aside from different color schemes and minor lettering differences, these are some of the major design changes:
1973 - First year the bike was released in the US as CB125S0. UK model CB125S with tachometer and exhaust with trumpet end.
1974 - Front drum brake changed to disk, tachometer was added.
1979 - Front disk brake was changed back to drum.
1980 - Point ignition was changed to capacitive discharge.
1983 - The bike was produced but not released for customers this year.
1984 - The electrical system was changed from 6 to 12 volts.
1985 - The last year the bike was released in the US, headlight shape was changed from round to rectangular.

US model year changes
Identifications, specifications, and changes throughout the years. This chart is for units sold In America only.

This table explains the specific changes year to year.

The components of the CB125 did not change much throughout the years unlike the appearance of the CB125. The majority of the changes made upon the bike was the color of the fuel tank, and the color of the decals. The color and Decals changed every year the Cb125 was produced.

Notes

CB125
Standard motorcycles
Motorcycles introduced in 1971